The Sea-Doo XP was a model of personal watercraft produced by Bombardier Recreational Products from 1991 to 2004. The Sea-Doo XP is a significant model in that it was the first high performance version of a sit-down style watercraft to be offered by any manufacturer. Since the craft's introduction, all other personal watercraft manufacturers have introduced and continue to offer high performance versions of their standard runabouts. In 2000, the XP was named Watercraft of the Century by Watercraft World magazine. During the 13 years it was available there were four generational changes resulting in design and performance improvements along with power increases from 55HP to 130HP.

First generation: 1991-1992 

The 1991-1992 XP was based on Sea-Doo's original hull introduced in 1988. In the XP, the SP's 580cc Rotax engine was upgraded with dual carburetors and a tuned exhaust pipe. The 91 had the original yellow motor and the 92 was upgraded to the white motor. The jet pump featured a stainless steel impeller. Visually, the XP featured a purple lower hull, pump, seat, cowling, and handle pole cover. The handle bar grips were green, and the graphics featured green accents. Also a first among watercraft, the cowling featured fixed dual mirrors and a pod for fuel gauge and tachometer on the top. The 1991 XP was named "Watercraft of the Year".

The motor & pump upgrades help the XP to reach speeds of 44 to 46 mph in magazine tests—the fastest of that time. The handling was characterized by the "lean out" riding style of all early Sea-Doos.

Second generation: 1993-1994 

The 1993–1994 XP was based on Sea-Doo's second generation SP hull.

The 1993 model was powered by a 650cc Rotax engine with dual carburetors and a tuned exhaust pipe and produced 70HP. A variable trim nozzle and bronze vanes were added to the jet pump. The hull, seat, cowling, and handlebar cover were now green, while the grips, intake grills, and boarding handle were red. The deck was white, and graphic accents were now red as well. Adjustable mirrors were added to the cowling.

1994 models were almost the same as the 93s except for some minor graphic changes and an increase in horsepower due to some carb and timing changes on the 657x version of the Rotax engine. However, the 93s did not have sponsons which greatly hurt performance. Seadoo offered a kit which included long GTX style sponsons to be mounted to the hull. This improved handling immensely, but sacrificed some top speed.

Third generation: 1995-1996  

For 1995, the XP sported the new X-4 hull which was based on race hulls used the previous year. The hull was extended at the rear, narrowed at the bow, and  sponsons were added on both sides of the stern. The X-4 hull handled far superior to the previous hulls. It had removable trim tabs at the rear which could be shimmed with a kit offered over the counter to trim the hull as desired. Also, a 4 inch long pump spacer was added in front of the pump. While this spacer added slightly to the top speed, it hurt performance in rough water because of the extra time it took to fill the increased volume with water once the pump came unhooked. The engine's displacement was again increased, now to 720cc, rated at 85 horsepower. The 95s used the same upper deck as 94s, aside of some color and graphic changes. The graphics theme moved from green and red to yellow and purple, with the hull, seat, intake grills, cowling and handle pole cover becoming yellow, while the grips, boarding handle, rub rail and traction mats became to purple. The deck remained white.

A limited edition model, the XP 800, was offered in 1995 as well. The 800 model featured a 110HP engine based on BRP's snowmobile motors. The new engine was 782cc and was equipped with pressure operated variable exhaust port timing valves, or (Rotax Automatic Variable Exhaust) R.A.V.E. valves, dual carburetors, and a tuned, variable water injected expansion chamber, which helped the XP 800 reach speeds of 59 mph. The 800 was also differentiated by a yellow hull, top deck, seat, cowling and handle pole cover. The cowling had a single gauge and no mirrors. The rear of the hull was pink, and the graphic accents were pink.

The 1996 XP carried over many of the features of the XP 800; the Type 787 R.A.V.E. valve 110HP motor, the trim strips, and had yellow upper and lower hulls. The standard XP cowling with adjustable mirrors and gauges returned. The graphic accents were pink, but the rear hull was left yellow.

The handling of all the third generation boats was still characterized by the "lean out" riding style.

Fourth generation: 1997-2004  

The 1997 XP was a marked departure from the previous models. An all new hull specific to the XP was developed which brought a "lean in" style of riding to the craft. Further enhancing this was Sea-Doo's "Direct Action Suspension," a raised seat that was mounted on a pivot and had a shock absorber at the opposite end. The 110HP 782cc engine was carried over, as was the predominantly yellow with black accents color scheme. The 1997 boat was over 90 lbs heavier than the 1996 boat, which resulted in slower acceleration from the previous year although realizing a top speed gain by about 1 mph. Nonetheless, the riding experience was enough for the XP to win WaterCraft World's Watercraft of the Year award in 1997.
For 1998, the power to weight issue was solved by the new XP Limited model. This craft was powered by a 951cc (called a Type 947) engine with reed valves on the intake and R.A.V.E. valves on the exhaust. The new engine produced 130HP and pushed the 1998 XP to 60 mph. Graphically, the lower hull, cowling, and handle pole cover were now black, and the hood and cowling pod were metallic gray.

The 1999 XP Limited mainly featured graphic changes, as the hull colorings remained unchanged from 1998. Many driveline upgrades were incorporated due to previous failures in the couplings.

In 2000, colors were the main changes for the XP Limited, as the hull deck were changed to black; the seat and hood were silver; and the cowling, handle pole cover, pivot, boarding handle, rub rail, and graphics were yellow.

2001 saw another color variation, with the hull remaining black while the top deck, hood, and seat became silver. The rub rail, pivots, and boarding handling were yellow, and the instrument pod and handle pole cover were black.

The 2002 XP Limited saw yet another graphic variation. The hood and boarding handle were black along with the hull, instrument pod, and handle pole cover; the deck remained silver; and the seat was now yellow along like the cowling and pivot points.

The "Limited" tag was dropped from 2003 and 2004 XPs and DI, for direct injection, was added. Orbital direct fuel injection was added to the 951 cc engine for improved fuel economy, performance, and emissions. The XP DIs were given a whole new color scheme: red hull, deck, cowling, and handle pole cover; black hood, pivots, rub rail, and boarding handle; and a silver seat.

Dimensions

References 

Bombardier Recreational Products
Personal water craft brands